David Goldberg may refer to:

David E. Goldberg (born 1953), American professor of engineering and computer science at University of Illinois at Urbana-Champaign
David Theo Goldberg (born 1952), South African philosopher and director of the University of California Humanities Research Institute
David Goldberg (PARC), engineer and computer scientist known for papers on floating point arithmetic and "Unistroke" handwriting recognition in the 1990s
Dave Goldberg (1967–2015), American Internet entrepreneur 
David Goldberg (psychiatrist), British academic and social psychiatrist

See also
Adam David Goldberg (born 1980), American football offensive tackle
Gary David Goldberg (1944–2013), American writer and producer for television and film